In the 1958 Tour de France, 120 cyclists entered, divided into 10 teams of 12 cyclists each. France, Italy, Belgium and Spain each sent a national team. The Netherlands and Luxembourg had a combined team, as had Switzerland and Germany. There was also one "international" team, consisting of cyclists from Austria, Portugal, Great Britain and Denmark. There were also three regional French teams: Centre-Midi, West/South West and Paris/North East.
The French team had had some problems with the selection, as Jacques Anquetil, the winner of the 1957 Tour de France, did not want to share leadership with Louison Bobet, winner in 1953, 1954 and 1955. Anquetil had been so superior in 1957, that he did not want Bobet and Géminiani both in his team. The French team selector then chose to include Bobet in the national team.
Raphael Géminiani, who had been in the French national team since 1949, was demoted into the regional Centre-Midi team. Géminiani was not pleased, and sent the French team director Marcel Bidot a jack-ass named "Marcel" to express his displeasure.

Charly Gaul, part of the Dutch/Luxembourgian team, anticipated so little help from his teammates that he announced that he would not share prizes. His teammates then refused to support him, so Gaul was on his own.

Start list

By team

By rider

By nationality

References

1958 Tour de France
1958